Daniel Łuczak (born 12 July 1996) is a Polish footballer who last played as a winger for Sokół Ostróda.

Senior career
Łuczak's career started at Śląsk Wrocław, playing in the youth sides before starting for the second team in 2016. After playing 31 times for Śląsk II and scoring 9 goals in the III liga, he started training with the first team in 2017. Łuczak made his first appearance for Śląsk coming on a substitute in the final game of the 2016–17 season in the 3–0 win over Wisła Płock. Before getting a first team contract with Śląsk, Łuczak found himself working as a delivery driver for KFC. After three seasons with Śląsk Wrocław and failing to consistently claim a starting position, Łuczak's contract was not renewed in 2019. In total he played 14 times for Śląsk in the Ekstraklasa scoring his only Ekstraklasa goal against Arka Gdynia. In August 2019 joined Polonia Trzebnica in the IV liga.

References

External links

1996 births
Living people
Polish footballers
Association football wingers
Śląsk Wrocław players
Ekstraklasa players